Cornelis Wijdekop (31 January 1914 – 8 April 2008), known as "Cor" or "Kees", was a Dutch sprint canoeist who competed in the late 1930s. He won a bronze medal in the folding K-2 10000 m event with his older brother Piet at the 1936 Summer Olympics in Berlin.

Wijdekop was born in Amsterdam, where he was an instrument maker by profession at Draka Holding. Cor and Piet were members of the canoe club De Plassers. He died in Purmerend.

Personal life
Cor Wijdekop was married to Maartje Wijdekop-Stokkink. Together they had a daughter, Joke (1942), and a son, Kees (1947). Kees Wijdekop was a pitcher for the Dutch national baseball team at the Baseball World Cup in Havana, Cuba, 1973.

References

External links
 
 
 

1914 births
2008 deaths
Dutch male canoeists
Olympic canoeists of the Netherlands
Olympic bronze medalists for the Netherlands
Olympic medalists in canoeing
Canoeists at the 1936 Summer Olympics
Medalists at the 1936 Summer Olympics
Sportspeople from Amsterdam
20th-century Dutch people
21st-century Dutch people